A Faithful Christmas is a Christmas album and the fifth studio album by American recording artist Faith Evans, released on October 25, 2005, by Capitol Records. Work on the album began in mid-2005 after the release of her fourth studio album The First Lady. A collection of holiday songs, it contains standards such as "White Christmas" and "Santa Baby" alongside two new compositions, "Happy Holiday" and "Christmas Wish", both of which were written by Evans and her daughter Chyna Griffin.

Reception

The album received generally mixed reviews from critics. In his review for Allmusic, Andy Kellman from wrote that the album sounded "very uneven and hastily thrown together." He criticized A Faithful Christmas for switching between "thoroughly modern" and classic Christmas songs, calling Evans's original material on the album "spirited but bland." He however praised her "straightforward version" of "The Day That Love Began." Chris Willman from Entertainment Weekly found that "some of her beat-heavy originals are Faith-based fun [but] misses include an old James Brown Xmas tune with way more 'Good Gods!' than any non-Godfather should attempt." People magazine writer Chuck Arnold felt that "the girliness of "Santa Baby" and playfulness of "Mistletoe and Holly" don't suit [Evans]. More fittingly, the CD closes with "O Come All Ye Faithful."

Track listing

Sample credits
"Soulful Christmas" contains a sample of the recording "Soulful Christmas" as performed by James Brown. 
"Christmas Wish" samples from "Merry Christmas Baby" as performed by James Brown.

Charts

Weekly charts

References

External links
 FaithEvansMusic.com 
 Faith Evans at MySpace
 [ Faith Evans - AllMusic]

Faith Evans albums
2005 Christmas albums
Contemporary R&B Christmas albums
Capitol Records Christmas albums
Christmas albums by American artists